SmartCam is a piece of open source software developed to allow Android, Symbian S60, Samsung Bada and Windows Phone phones, with Bluetooth  or WiFi connectivity, to use their integrated cameras as a webcam for use with a compatible PC. PC versions available for both Windows and Linux.

References

Cross-platform mobile software